Maafannu is a district of Malé, Maldives.

Location within Malé City 
Maafannu is on the western portion of Malé Island:

Notable Places 

 Indira Gandhi Memorial Hospital
 Maldives National University Faculty of Health Sciences
 Rasfannu Artificial Beach
 Schwack Cinema
 Theemuge (Supreme Court)
 Tsunami Monument
 Villingili Ferry Terminal
 Voice of Maldives

References 

Populated places in the Maldives